Wick John O' Groats Airport  is located  north of the town of Wick, at the north-eastern extremity of the mainland of Scotland. It is owned and maintained by Highlands and Islands Airports Limited. The airport provides commercial air travel connections for Caithness, with scheduled services to Aberdeen Airport and, until early 2020, Edinburgh. It remains regularly used by helicopters servicing local offshore oil operations and the Beatrice Offshore Windfarm. It also serves as a stop-over for light aircraft ferry flights between Europe and North America via Iceland. The airport also operates an out of hours call-out service for air ambulances, coastguard and police flights.

History
Wick was originally a grass airfield, used by Captain E. E. Fresson's Highland Airways Ltd. (later Scottish Airways Ltd.) from 1933 until 1939.

Requisitioned by the Air Ministry during World War II, the airfield was extended with hard runways, hangars, and other buildings. The airfield was administered by No. 18 Group, RAF Coastal Command and known as RAF Wick (Royal Air Force Wick). A satellite airfield existed at RAF Skitten.

On 21 May 1941, a photographic reconnaissance Supermarine Spitfire piloted by Flying Officer Michael F. Suckling took off from Wick, and flew to Norway, in search of the German battleship Bismarck. If Bismarck was to break out into the North Atlantic, she would present a significant risk to the ships supplying Britain. 320 miles to the east of Wick, F/O Suckling found and photographed her, hiding in Grimstadfjord. This information enabled the Royal Navy to order HMS Hood and other ships, as well as aircraft, to take positions intended to track Bismarck, and prevent her from entering the North Atlantic. In ensuing battles, Hood was sunk, and, later, Bismarck.

German battleships and battle cruisers never again entered the North Atlantic, partly because of continual reconnaissance flights by the RAF of German naval activity. Many of these flights originated at Wick. On 5 March 1942, RAF reconnaissance pilot Sandy Gunn (a native of Auchterarder, Perthshire), was shot down in his Spitfire on a flight from Wick over German naval installations in Norway. He survived and became a prisoner of war, but two years later he was executed after participating in the "Great Escape" from Stalag Luft III.

The following units were here at some point:

Units

Airlines and destinations
Loganair operated regular flights from Wick between 1976 and 2020, with the final flight to Edinburgh departing on 27 March 2020.
On 19 June 2020, Eastern Airways revoked its Aberdeen Service, leaving the airport with no scheduled services.

The Scottish Government announced on 4 February 2021, that they would provide up to £4 million to the Highland Council in order to reintroduce flights to and from Wick Airport.

Eastern Airways began operating the public service obligation flight to Aberdeen on 11 April 2022.

Statistics

References

Citations

Bibliography

External links 

 

 Official Facebook page
 Official Twitter Page
 Wick John O'Groats AIP Entry

Airports in Scotland
Highlands and Islands Airports
Airports established in 1933
1933 establishments in Scotland
Wick, Caithness